The Arapesh languages are several closely related Torricelli languages of the 32,000 Arapesh people of Papua New Guinea. They are spoken in eastern Sandaun Province and northern East Sepik Province, Papua New Guinea.

The Arapesh languages are among the better-studied of Papuan languages and are most distinctive in their gender systems, which contain up to thirteen genders (noun classes) with noun-phrase concordance. Mufian, for example, has 17 noun classes for count nouns plus two extra noun classes, i.e. proper names and place names. (See that article for examples.)

Phonology
The most notable feature of the Arapesh phoneme inventory is the use of labialization as a contrastive device.

Consonants

Vowels

Arapesh syllables have the structure (C)V(V)(C), though in monosyllables there is a requirement that the coda be filled.

Normally either of the higher central vowels (ɨ, ə) is inserted to break up consonant clusters in the middle of words.

Pronouns
Pronouns in Arapesh and other related Torricelli languages:

{| 
!  !! Kombio !! Mountain Arapesh !! Southern Arapesh !! Urim !! Urat !! Aruop !! Kayik
|-
! 1sg
| apm || yek~eik || aeʔ || kupm || ŋam || am || kəmex
|-
! 2sg
| yikn || ɲak~ɲek || inəʔ || kitn || nin || yi || kiyox
|-
! 3sg
| kɨl || ənan~nani || ənən || kil || kin || din || təno
|-
! 1pl
| an(t) || okok~kwakwi || apə || men || poi || mendi || kupox
|}

Vocabulary comparison
The following basic vocabulary words are from the Trans-New Guinea database:

{| class="wikitable sortable"
! gloss !! Abu' Arapesh !! Bukiyip
|-
! head
| bʌrʌkʰa || berag
|-
! hair
| bʌrʌkʰa || 
|-
! ear
| ɛligʌ || atah
|-
! eye
| ŋʌim || nabep
|-
! nose
| mutu || 
|-
! tooth
| nʌluh || nau̥h̥
|-
! tongue
| ʌhʌkʌ || jaham
|-
! leg
| burʔah || aijag
|-
! louse
| numunʌl || 
|-
! dog
| nubʌt || nybat
|-
! pig
| bul || 
|-
! bird
| ʌlimil || aramir
|-
! egg
| ʌlhuʌb || juhuryb
|-
! blood
| usibɛl || ausibør
|-
! bone
| pisitʌnʌgel || bøløpigør
|-
! skin
| beni'koh || jageniu̥h̥
|-
! breast
| numʌb || 
|-
! tree
| lʌ·wʌk || lawag
|-
! man
| ʌʔlemʌn || araman
|-
! woman
| numʌto || ara- matoku
|-
! sun
| uʔwʌh || aun
|-
! moon
| 'ʌ'un || aun
|-
! water
| ʌbʌl || bør
|-
! fire
| unih || nih̥
|-
! stone
| utʌm || utom
|-
! road, path
| iʌh || 
|-
! name
| ɛigil || 
|-
! eat
| 'nʌsʌh || 
|-
! one
| etin || 
|-
! two
| biəs || bium
|}

Grammar
Recent shifts have moved Arapesh languages from the typical Papuan SOV to a SVO order, along with a corresponding shift in adpositional order. Most modifiers usually precede the noun, though as a result of changes in word order genitives and nouns do not have a fixed order.

The language's unique gender system is largely based on the ending of the noun. There are cognate pairings of each gender for singular and plural numbers. The whole gender system, unlike most of the comparable complexity in Niger–Congo languages, is sex-based: Gender IV is for all female beings and Gender VII for male ones. Arapesh culture forbids the use of personal names, so that kinship nouns are used extensively to address even intimate relatives.

Arapesh languages also have a system of verbal nouns: there by default belong to gender VIII.

Gender agreement, along with that for person and number, occurs with all adjectives, numerals and interrogative pronouns and the subject and object of verbs. Verbs in Arapesh languages are inflected by means of prefixes. The basic template for this inflection is the order SUBJECT-MOOD-ROOT.

References

External links
 WALS: Arapesh
 Arapesh Grammar & Digital Language Archive

Further reading
Dobrin, Lise M.: Concreteness in Grammar: The Noun Class Systems of the Arapesh Languages. Stanford: CSLI, 2012. 

 
Torricelli Range languages
Languages of Papua New Guinea